

Persian
Namjoo is a Persian surname. People with this surname include:
Mahmoud Namjoo (1918–1990), Iranian weightlifter
Mousa Namjoo (1938–1981), Iranian military officer
Majid Namjoo (born 1963), Iranian politician
Majid Namjoo-Motlagh (born 1967), Iranian soccer player
Mohsen Namjoo (born 1976), Iranian singer-songwriter and player

Korean
Namjoo is also a Korean unisex given name. People with this given name include:
Kim Nam-joo (actress) (born 1971), actress
Kim Nam-joo (singer) (born 1995), singer and actress

Fictional characters include:
 Oh Nam-joo from 2019 Korean drama Extraordinary You

Persian-language surnames
Korean unisex given names